Ibrahim Qanber (Arabic:إبراهيم قنبر) (born 1 April 1990) is an Emirati footballer who plays as a midfielder, most recently for Al-Dhaid.

References

External links
 

Emirati footballers
1990 births
Living people
Al Shabab Al Arabi Club Dubai players
Al-Shaab CSC players
Dibba FC players
Al Dhaid SC players
UAE First Division League players
UAE Pro League players
Association football midfielders